Lakeview Cemetery Company is a cemetery located at Colborne Road and Michigan Avenue in Sarnia, Ontario. Opened in 1879 by the Town of Sarnia to replace smaller and church-based cemeteries, it is most notable for being the burial place of Canadian Prime Minister Alexander Mackenzie. The cemetery, which is still an active burial site and now has a crematorium, contains the war graves of 11 Canadian service personnel of World War I and 13 of World War II.

Other notables buried here include:
 Alexander Vidal – Ontario Senator and MLA for the United Provinces of Canada
 Frederick Forsyth Pardee – Ontario MPP and MP; Senator
 William Thomas Goodison – MP for Sarnia

References

Further reading
 Jennifer McKendry (2003). Into the silent land : historic cemeteries & graveyards in Ontario, Kingston, Ont.,

External links
 Lakeview Cemetery burial search
 

Sarnia
Cemeteries in Ontario
Buildings and structures in Lambton County
1879 establishments in Ontario